Chophouse Row is a mixed-use development in Seattle, in the U.S. state of Washington. The $16 million project houses approximately 15 businesses amidst apartments and office spaces.

Chophouse Row opened in 2015. Previously, the space served as an automobile repair shop.

Tenants 

By Tae operated art Chophouse Row from late 2018 or 2019 to 2021. The wine bar Light Sleeper opened in 2022. Other businesses have included:

 Amandine
 Bar Ferdinand
 Bootyland
 Chop Shop
 From Typhoon
 Kurt Farm Shop
 Marmite
 Sweet Alchemy
 Two Owls
 Wunderground

Reception 
Chelsea Lin, Rosin Saez, and Zoe Sayler included Chophouse Row in Seattle Metropolitan's 2021 list of "16 of Our Favorite Capitol Hill Shops".

References

External links 

 

2015 establishments in Washington (state)
Buildings and structures in Seattle
Mixed-use developments in the United States